

List of Ambassadors

Marina Rosenberg 2019 - 2022
Eldad Hayet 2016 - 2019
Rafael Eldad 2014 - 2016
David Dadonn 2009 - 2014
David Cohen (diplomat) 2005 - 2009
Josef Regev 2000 - 2005
Ori Noy 1997 - 2000
Pinchas Avivi 1993 - 1997 
Daniel Mokady 1989 - 1993
Zvi Tenney 1987 - 1989 
David Efrati 1983 - 1987
Yitzhak Shefi 1978 - 1979
Moshe Avidan 1975 - 1978
Moshe Tov 1971 - 1975 
Dov Sattath 1968 - 1971
Eliezer Doron 1958 - 1963
Minister Arieh Leon Kubovy (Non-Resident, Buenos Aires) 1953 - 1958
Minister Jacob Tzur (Non-Resident, Buenos Aires) 1949 - 1953

References

Chile
Israel